The 4th Tennessee Cavalry Regiment was a cavalry regiment that served in the Confederate States Army during the American Civil War.

Overview 
The unit was originally organized as the 3rd Regiment at Camp Robertson, Bledsoe County, Tennessee, in May 1862. Four companies were supplemented to James W. Starnes' 8th Cavalry Battalion to form the new regiment. 

The 4th Tennessee Cavalry saw action at the battles of Parker's Cross Roads, Franklin, Chickamauga, and in the Atlanta Campaign. It was later separated into two regiments serving in different departments of the army, one under General Forrest and the other under General Wheeler. The two regiments were reunited in January 1865 and served in the Carolinas until surrendering on April 26.

Commanders 
In one of the cavalry battles around Tullahoma, Colonel James W. Starnes was killed in action. Colonel William S. McLemore, of Franklin, succeeded to his command.

See also 

 List of Tennessee Confederate Civil War units

References 

Units and formations of the Confederate States Army from Tennessee
Military units and formations disestablished in 1865
1865 disestablishments in Tennessee